Pétur Sigurgeirsson (2 June 1919 – 4 June 2010) was the Bishop of Iceland from 1981 until 1989.

Biography
Pétur  was the son of Sigurgeir Sigurdsson who later became Bishop of Iceland and Gudrún Pétursdóttir. He had 3 other siblings and was the oldest amongst them. He graduated from Reykjavík University in 1940 and studied theology at the University of Iceland and graduated in 1944. He undertook a master's degree at the Lutheran Theological Seminary at Philadelphia in Philadelphia and studied journalism, English and Biblical Studies at Stanford University, California. In 1947, he was ordained priest and served in the parish of Akureyri. He became the Bishop of Hólar in 1969. On October 1, 1981 he was elected as Bishop of Iceland.

External links
Pétur Sigurgeirsson biskup látinn
Visit of Pope John Paul II to Iceland
Pétur Sigurgeirsson er látinn
Pétur Sigurgeirsson

1919 births
2010 deaths
20th-century Lutheran bishops
Petur Sigurgeirsson
Pétur Sigurgeirsson